The Incomati rock catlet or Incomati suckermouth (Chiloglanis bifurcus) is a species of upside-down catfish native to Mozambique, South Africa and Eswatini where it is only found in the Crocodile-Incomati River system.  This species grows to a length of  SL.

References

External links
 
 

Chiloglanis
Freshwater fish of Africa
Freshwater fish of South Africa
Fish of Mozambique
Fish of Eswatini
Fish described in 1969
Taxonomy articles created by Polbot